Charley Run is a  long 1st order tributary to the Allegheny River in Venango County, Pennsylvania.

Course
Charley Run rises about 2 miles north of Oil City, Pennsylvania, and then flows south-southeast to join the Allegheny River at Oil City.

Watershed
Charley Run drains  of area, receives about 44.4 in/year of precipitation, and has a wetness index of 373.89 and is about 90% forested.

References

Additional Maps

Rivers of Pennsylvania
Rivers of Venango County, Pennsylvania
Tributaries of the Allegheny River